John Leonard Watling (18 December 1923 - 10 July 2004) was a British philosopher and Head of philosophy department at University College London.

References

External links
Watling Archive

People from East Sheen
Philosophy academics
1923 births
2004 deaths
Academics of University College London
Analytic philosophers
20th-century British philosophers